For information on computer file types, see:

 File format

For information relating to specific operating systems, see also:
 Apple file types
Macintosh OSTypes
Uniform type identifier
 Unix file types
 Windows file types

For a list of filename extensions, see
 list of file formats
 list of filename extensions (alphabetical) 

For information on related concepts, see also:
 file system
 extended attributes